Edward Abnel Keli'iahonui Kawānanakoa (October 2, 1924 – July 29, 1997) was a member of the House of Kawānanakoa.

Life 
He was born October 2, 1924, to Abigail Kawānanakoa and her first husband, Andrew Anderson Lambert, in San Francisco, California. He was named after his great-uncle Prince Edward Abnel Keliʻiahonui who died at a young age.

His grandfather David Kawānanakoa (1868–1908) was officially named as the one of the heirs to King David Kalākaua in his will. Although many in the native Hawaiian community considered him the heir to the throne, he considered himself an American citizen.  As one of several heirs to the estate of his great-grandfather James Campbell, he often donated to community charities.  He graduated from Punahou School and then left in 1942 for Menlo College.  While in California, he joined the Army Air Corps and served as a pilot in World War II.  He rejected an appointment to the United States Military Academy and instead obtained a degree from the University of Southern California.

In 1946, Kawānanakoa married Lila de Clark Whitaker.  In 1960, the couple were divorced.  Kawānanakoa married again to Carolyn Branch and had two children of their own.  On July 29, 1997, Kawānanakoa died and was survived by his wife, eight children and his two sisters, Virginia Poomaikelani Kawānanakoa and Esther Kapiolani Kawānanakoa and cousin Abigail Kinoiki Kekaulike Kawānanakoa.
He was buried at the Oahu Cemetery.

Children 
 Edward A. K. Kawānanakoa, Jr., son
 David Klaren Kawānanakoa II, son
 Quentin Kawānanakoa, son
 Andrew Piʻikoi Kawānanakoa, son
 Regina Kawānanakoa, daughter
 Travis Branch, stepson
 Corey Branch, stepson
 Young Branch, stepdaughter

References 

1924 births
1997 deaths
People from Honolulu
People from San Francisco
House of Kawānanakoa
Pretenders to the Hawaiian throne
Princes of Hawaii
Punahou School alumni
American military personnel of Native Hawaiian descent
Military personnel from Hawaii
United States Army Air Forces pilots of World War II
Menlo College alumni
University of Southern California alumni
Military personnel from California